The 2022 Under-20 Intercontinental Cup was the inaugural edition of the UEFA–CONMEBOL Under-20 Intercontinental Cup, a football match organised by CONMEBOL and UEFA between the winners of the U-20 Copa Libertadores and UEFA Youth League. CONMEBOL was in charge of the main organization of this edition.

The Under-20 Intercontinental Cup was officially launched on 2 June 2022 as part of the UEFA–CONMEBOL memorandum of understanding.

The single match was played on 21 August 2022 at Estadio Centenario in Montevideo, Uruguay, between Uruguayan team Peñarol, the 2022 U-20 Copa Libertadores champions, and Portuguese team Benfica, the 2021–22 UEFA Youth League champions.

Benfica beat Peñarol 1–0, becoming the first ever winners of the Under-20 Intercontinental Cup.

Background
This was the first meeting between Peñarol and Benfica in the under-20 category. However, the senior teams of both clubs have faced four times. They played three matches for the 1961 Intercontinental Cup; the first of which was won 1–0 by Benfica on 4 September 1961 at Estádio da Luz in Lisbon, the second was won 5–0 by Peñarol on 17 September 1961 at Estadio Centenario in Montevideo. The third, also held at Estadio Centenario, was a play-off of the previous two and was won by Peñarol with a 2–1 score on 19 September 1961. The last match between Peñarol and Benfica was on 29 August 1971 for the Ramón de Carranza Trophy, which was won 3–1 by Benfica.

Teams

Pre-match

Officials
The refereeing team was appointed by the Referees Committees of CONMEBOL and UEFA; only referees in the FIFA International Referees List were eligible (Regulations articles 28 and 29). On 12 August 2022, CONMEBOL announced the refereeing team with Paraguayan official Derlis López as the referee for the match. López had been a FIFA referee since 2019. He was joined by four of his fellow countrymen, including assistant referees Roberto Cañete and José Villagra, with José Méndez serving as the fourth official, Germán Delfino acted as the video assistant referee (VAR) and Maximiliano Del Yesso was the assistant VAR official (AVAR), both from Argentina.

Squads
Only players born on or after 1 January 2002 were eligible to compete. Teams were permitted to make player replacements in cases of serious injuries up to 24 hours prior the start of the match (Regulations articles 26 and 27).

Peñarol announced its squad on 18 August, which included forwards Máximo Alonso and Brian Mansilla, midfielder Nicolás Rossi and defender Matías González, all of them with appearances in the Peñarol's senior team.

Benfica announced its squad on 19 August, which did not include forward Henrique Araújo, who scored 3 goals in the 2021–22 UEFA Youth League final, but included defender Tomás Araújo and winger Pedro Santos, all of them being considered in the main team by coach Roger Schmidt.

Match

Details

Notes

References

UEFA–CONMEBOL
UEFA–CONMEBOL
International club association football competitions hosted by Uruguay
UEFA–CONMEBOL
UEFA–CONMEBOL
UEFA–CONMEBOL